Harvest House International Church, otherwise known as HHI Church, is a charismatic church founded in 1995 by Bishop Dr Colin Nyathi and Senior Reverend Dr Sarah Nyathi. From the first service of fewer than ten people in their living room in the city of Bulawayo in Zimbabwe in 1995, this church has grown to more than 6000 in attendance on a single Sunday service. Due to the limitation of space, the current building cannot take the number of people hence a total of ten services are carried out on a Sunday.

Senior pastors
Colin and Sarah Nyathi are parents of five adult children. Colin was previously a financial director of a large engineering house in Bulawayo before becoming a full-time pastor. Sarah, an entrepreneur, was Miss Lux Zimbabwe and has been involved in much training of young entrepreneurs in her nation. Colin functions in the apostolic office and is an unapologetic church planter. They host a television programme called Open Heavens which features in Southern Africa. Sarah runs "Maximised Lifestyle International", an arm of HHI Church that helps ladies within the church to be self-sufficient and grow spiritually and in real life. This couple offers spiritual oversight to all their pastors and elders as well as a number from other churches.

Church premises
Currently, their services are held in ten different venues across the city centre with the new headquarters now situated at Corner 10th Avenue & George Silundika. 
Harvest House International Church is currently building a 10,000-seat auditorium in Woodlands Bulawayo. 
It is set to be complete in 2020.

Other churches
HHI has established churches all over the world and still growing. To date, a total of 700 churches have been established , mostly in Africa. There are churches in Australia - Brisbane and Perth - and in UK, London. The migration of Zimbabweans due to the financial and political crisis that affected that country between 2000 and 2009 saw many sons of this house establish HHI in the various countries of their destination. In Africa, HHI is found in the following countries: South Africa, Botswana, Eswatini, Australia, Sierra Leone, Tanzania, Cyprus, Abu Dhabi, UK, Zambia, Mozambique, Namibia and Nigeria.

HHI School of Ministry
The School of Ministry offers courses as follows:
 Certificate in Biblical Studies
 Diploma in Biblical Studies
 Higher Diploma in Pastoral Studies
 Higher Diploma in Prophetic Studies
 Higher Diploma in Apostolic Studies
 Higher Diploma in Ministerial Excellence

Since the inception of the school, in the early 2000s, more than 7000 people have graduated from the school. At some stage, more than 1000 students had enrolled in this school in one year in the city of Bulawayo. Sister schools have been established in most of the churches around the world. The Zimbabwean School is affiliated to The Ministry of Higher and Tertiary Education and Good Shepherd Ministries, US.

New church building complex
HHI is currently in the process of building, arguably one of the largest conference centre in Southern Africa, housing 10,000 people. The building is located in the city of Bulawayo, Zimbabwe, where the ministry originated.

Harvest music
Harvest Music is a Music ministry of Harvest House International Church. Harvest House has raised many renowned Gospel musicians in Zimbabwe and outside the other nations.
Albums released to date
 Genesis
 At the Altar

External links
https://www.hhi.org.za
https://www.schoolofministry.hhi.org.za
https://web.archive.org/web/20121113095636/http://home.harvesthouseint.org/index.php/about-harvest-house-international-churches/visionaries
https://web.archive.org/web/20110809024050/http://www.hhibrisbane.org/
https://web.archive.org/web/20120402214504/http://hhijhb.org.za/
https://web.archive.org/web/20110906143845/http://hhiperth.org/
https://web.archive.org/web/20120402214459/http://www.hpmichurch.org/default/default.cfm?linkid=35
https://web.archive.org/web/20130404002037/http://www.harvestmasvingo.org/

Charismatic denominations
Protestantism in Zimbabwe